António Sebastião Spínola (Machico, Porto da Cruz, 13 July 1875 – Machico, Porto da Cruz, 19 March 1956) was an Inspector General of Finances and Chief of Cabinet of the Finance Minister Professor Oliveira Salazar and afterwards of Finance Minister Professor João Pinto da Costa Leite, 4th Conde de Lumbrales, Councilor and Administrator of the Fundação da Casa de Bragança, etc.

He was the oldest child and son of António Sebastião Spínola (Machico, Porto da Cruz, 2 March 1845 - ?), a natural son recognised on 7 January 1853, landowner in the Island of Madeira, and wife (m. Machico, Porto da Cruz, 18 May 1874) Maria José da Silva (Machico, Porto da Cruz, 18 October 1854 - ?), also a natural daughter.

He married firstly in Funchal, São Pedro, on 6 September 1902 to Maria Gabriela Alves Ribeiro (Funchal, São Pedro, 14 June 1884 - ?), daughter of Francisco Antonio Rivera y Amigo (Galicia, Pontevedra, Pontevedra, Santiago de Covelo, 1855 - ?), a Galician merchant in Funchal where he lived, and wife (m. Funchal, Sé, 20 November 1880) Virgínia Alves (Funchal, Sé, 1860 - ?), also a natural daughter, by whom he had four children: 
 Maria Emília Ribeiro Spínola (1905 - Estremoz, Santo André, August 1906 at age 16 months)
 António Sebastião Ribeiro Spínola (1910–1996), Portuguese President of the Republic
 Francisco Ribeiro Spínola (Almada, 16 August 1912 – Lisbon, 1994), married to Corina Flores Cabeça (Beja, 2 December 1916 –), from a branch of the Cabeza de Vaca family of Extremadura that went to Alentejo in the 19th century, and had issue
 Gabriela Ribeiro Spínola, who died a child

He married secondly Alice de Lemos de Araújo, without issue.

References

Sources
 Fotobiografias do Século XX, Photobiography of António de Spínola, Círculo de Leitores.

1875 births
1956 deaths
Government ministers of Portugal
People from Machico, Madeira